Limburgish (  or  ;  ;), also called Limburgan, Limburgian, or Limburgic, is a West Germanic language spoken in the Dutch and Belgian provinces of Limburg and in the neighbouring regions of Germany (North Rhine-Westphalia).

It shares vocabulary and grammatical characteristics with both German and Dutch, but has some unique features as well, such as tonality. Within the modern communities of the Belgian and Dutch provinces of Limburg, intermediate idiolects are also very common, which combine standard Dutch with the accent and some grammatical and pronunciation tendencies derived from Limburgish. This "Limburgish Dutch" is confusingly also often referred to simply as "Limburgish", although in Belgium such intermediate languages tend to be called  ("in-between language"), no matter the exact dialect/language with which standard Dutch is combined.

Although frequently misunderstood as such, Limburgish as a linguistic term does not refer to the regional variety of Dutch spoken in Dutch Limburg and Belgian Limburg. Since Limburgish is still the mother tongue of many inhabitants in the aforementioned region, Limburgish grammar, vocabulary and pronunciation can have a significant impact on the way locals speak Dutch in public life.

Etymology 
The name Limburgish (and variants of it) derives only indirectly from the now Belgian town of Limbourg (Laeboer in Limburgish,), which was the capital of the Duchy of Limburg during the Middle Ages. More directly it is derived from the more modern name of the Province of Limburg (1815–39) in the Kingdom of the Netherlands, which has been split today into a Belgian Limburg and a Dutch Limburg. In the area around the old Duchy of Limburg the main language today is French, but there is also a particular cluster of Limburgish (or Limburgish-like, depending on definitions) dialects which are sometimes described as "Low Dietsch".

People from Limburg usually call their language Plat, the same as Low German speakers do. This plat refers simply to the fact that the language is spoken in the low plains country, as opposed to the use of "High" in "High German languages", which are derived from dialects spoken in the more mountainous southerly regions. The word "plat" is therefore associated both with the platteland (Dutch: "countryside") and can in effect sometimes mean simply "slang" in the sense of any very informal, rustic or locally unique words or expressions. 

An older Dutch term for the West Germanic languages and dialects of ordinary people was Dietsch or Duutsch, as still found in the term Low Dietsch (Plattdütsch).  This term is originally derived from Proto-Germanic "þiudiskaz", meaning "of the people". (This word has also been preserved in the Italian word for German, which is "Tedesco", and the English word "Dutch", referring to people from the Netherlands.)

Extent

Limburgish has partially overlapping definition areas, depending on the criteria used:
 All dialects spoken within the political boundary of the two Limburg provinces.
 Limburgish according to Jo Daan, the associative "arrow" method of Meertens Institute.
 South Lower Franconian, isogloss definition between the Uerdingen and Benrath lines by Wenker, Schrijnen and Goossens (University of Leuven).
 Western limit of Limburgish pitch accent (Largest lexical distance from Standard Dutch, Hoppenbrouwers)
 Southeast Limburgish dialect (Wintgens and Frins); this includes a part of the Ripuarian language in Germany.

History and classification

Except for the Southeast Limburgish dialects such as those of Kerkrade and Vaals, Modern Limburgish descends from some of the  Low Franconian language varieties that formed the offspring of Old Dutch in the Early Middle Ages, its history being at least as long as that of other Low Franconian varieties, of which some eventually yielded Standard Dutch. Being a variety of Franconian descent, Limburgish is today often considered as a regional language overarched by two succeeding Dachsprachen, which are Dutch in Belgium and the Netherlands and German in Germany.

Under the influence of the Merovingian and especially the Carolingian dynasty, Eastern Low Franconian underwent much influence from the neighbouring High German languages. This resulted among other things in the partial participation of Eastern Low Franconian in the High German consonant shift in the 10th and especially the 11th century, which makes the Limburgish-speaking area also part of the so-called Rhenish fan. It is especially this trait which distinguishes Limburgish from Western Low Franconian.

In the past, all Limburgish dialects were therefore sometimes seen as West Central German, part of High German. This difference is caused by a difference in definition: the latter stance defines a High German variety as one that has taken part in any of the first three phases of the High German consonant shift. It is nevertheless most common in linguistics to consider Limburgish as Low Franconian.

From the 13th century on, however, the Duchy of Brabant extended its power. As a consequence, at first the western (i.e. spoken until Genk) and then also the eastern variants of Limburgish underwent great influence of Brabantian. When Standard Dutch was formed out of elements of different Low Franconian dialects in the 16th century, the Limburgish dialects spoken in the Low Countries had little or no influence on this process. As a result, Limburgish – although being essentially a variety of Low Franconian – still has a considerable distance from Standard Dutch with regards to phonology, morphology and lexicon today. Moreover, being of East Low Franconian origin, it also has many distinctive features in comparison with the West Low Franconian varieties such as the Hollandic dialect, the Brabantian dialect and South Guelderish.

Limburgish and Meuse-Rhenish 

In German sources, the dialects linguistically counting as Limburgish spoken to the east of the river Rhine are called Bergish (named after the former Duchy of Berg). Not only West of the river Rhine (the former Duchy of Jülich) they are called "Low Rhenish", which is considered a transitional zone between Low Franconian and Ripuarian. Thus, formerly German linguists tended to call these dialects Low German.

Limburgish is spoken in a considerable part of the German Lower Rhine area, in what linguistically (though not in any sense politically) could be called German Limburg. This area extends from the border regions of Cleves, Aachen, Viersen and Heinsberg, stretching out to the Rhine river. Modern linguists, both in the Netherlands and in Germany, now often combine these distinct varieties with the Cleves dialects (Kleverländisch). This superordinating group of Low Franconian varieties (between the rivers Meuse and Rhine) is called Meuse-Rhenish (German: Rheinmaasländisch; Dutch: Rijn-Maaslands or Maas-Rijnlands).

Both Limburgish and Low Rhenish belong to this greater Meuse-Rhine area, building a large group of southeastern Low Franconian dialects, including areas in Belgium, the Netherlands and the German Northern Rhineland. The northwestern part of this triangle came under the influence of the Dutch standard language, especially since the founding of the United Kingdom of the Netherlands in 1815. At the same time, the southeastern portion became part of the Kingdom of Prussia, and was subject to High German language domination. At the dialectal level however, mutual understanding is still possible far beyond both sides of the national borders.

The Meuse-Rhenish dialects can be divided into Northern and Southern varieties. Hence, Limburgish is Southwestern Meuse-Rhenish as spoken in Belgium, the Netherlands and the German Lower Rhine. The Northeastern Meuse-Rhenish dialects as spoken in the Netherlands and in Germany (a little eastward along the Rhine) are unambiguously Low Franconian and can be considered as Dutch. As discussed above, Limburgish straddles the borderline between "Low Franconian" and "Middle Franconian" varieties. These Southwestern Meuse-Rhenish dialects are more-or-less mutually intelligible with the Ripuarian dialects, but have been influenced less by the High German consonant shift (R. Hahn 2001).

Form
Limburgish is far from being homogeneous. In other words, it has numerous varieties instead of one single standard form. Between 1995 and 1999, a uniform standard form called AGL (Algemein Gesjreve Limburgs, "Generally written Limburgish") was developed and proposed, but found too little support. Today the so-called "Veldeke-spelling" which was first applied in the 1940s is most of the time used to write in a specific Limburgish dialect. In 2000 the parliament of the province of Dutch Limburg enacted a measure establishing the Limburgish Language Council (Raod veur 't Limburgs), a committee which advises the Parliament of Dutch Limburg on measures in relation to Limburgish. In 2003 the Limburgish Language Council adopted a standard orthography for Limburgish.  On the basis of this standard orthography the Limburgish Academy Foundation (Stiechting Limbörgse Academie) is creating Limburgish-Dutch, Limburgish-English, Dutch-Limburgish and English-Limburgish dictionaries.

Contemporary usage
Limburgish is spoken by approximately 1.6 million people in the Low Countries and by many hundreds of thousands in Germany. It is especially in the Dutch province of Limburg that Limburgish is used not only in everyday speech, but also often in more formal situations and on the local and regional radio. According to a recent study by Geert Driessen, in 2011 Limburgish was spoken by 54 percent of the adults and 31 percent of the children. Limburgish has no real written tradition, except for its early beginnings. Hendrik van Veldeke wrote in a Middle Limburgish dialect. Especially in the Netherlands, the cultural meaning of the language is also important. Many song texts are written in a Limburgish dialect, for example during Carnival. Jack Poels writes most of his texts for Rowwen Hèze in Sevenums, a local dialect within the Northern Limburgish dialects, which is often wrongly assumed to be part of the Limburgish dialect, since the Northern Limburgs dialect is classified in the greater group of South Guelderish dialects and not in the Limburgish dialects.

To what degree Limburgish actually is spoken in Germany today remains a matter of debate. Depending on the city in these parts of Germany, 50% to 90% of the population speak a local or regional form of Meuse-Rhenish, which is either Limburgish or Bergish, according to A. Schunck 2001. However, this percentage seems to be a clear overestimation, as far as the German situation is concerned. The same holds true for his estimation of the Belgian situation. Moreover, research into some specific variants seems to indicate a gradual process of development towards the national standardised Dutch, especially amongst younger generations. In Belgium, the Limburgish dialects are more endangered than in the Netherlands.

Linguistic versus societal status
In March 1997 the Dutch government recognised Limburgish as a regional language (Dutch: streektaal) in the Netherlands. As such, it receives moderate protection under chapter 2 of the European Charter for Regional or Minority Languages.

However, it has been argued by some linguists that this recognition was highly politically motivated and done more on sociolinguistic than purely linguistic grounds. In 1999, the Dutch Language Union, the de facto language authority which asserted that it had not been asked for advice, opposed the recognition. From the Limburgish side it has been argued that the arguments put forth against the recognition of Limburgish were not based on linguistic considerations, but rather a concern for maintaining the dominance of the Dutch language.

On the other hand, Limburgish has not been recognised by the German and Belgian national governments as an official language so far.  An attempt at recognition, made after Limburgish had been recognised in the Netherlands, failed in the Belgian parliament due to Flemish opposition. Because in Belgium political power is divided according to linguistic lines, recognizing Limburgish as an official language would have had considerable constitutional implications and undermine the small majority Flemish speakers hold over Walloon speakers in the Belgian State.

Subdivisions of Limburgish

Principal dialects 

 Limburgish
 East Limburgish
 Limbrichts dialect (Lömmerichs)
 Sittard dialect (Zittesj)
 Stein dialect (Steins)
 Susters dialect (Zösters)
 Central Limburgish
 Montfortian dialect (Mofers)
 Roermond dialect (Remunjs)
 Weert dialect (Wieërts)
 Maastrichtian dialect (Mestreechs)
 Southeast Limburgish (overlaps more or less with Ripuarian)
 Aachen dialect
 Kerkrade dialect (Kirchröadsj)
 Heerlen dialect
 West Limburgish
 Hasselt dialect (Hessels)
Veldeke dialect

The dialect of Venlo is generally considered a transition dialect between East Limburgish and Kleverlandish.

Expanded

 is a concept used in Germany to describe the Limburgish language ("South Low Franconian") of Germany. It is a group spoken in a part of the Bergisches Land Region near Düsseldorf east of the Rhine and in the lower Rhine area between the rivers Rhine and Maas, the latter (called  or  "Southeast Low Franconian") shortly behind the Dutch–German border in the vicinity of Heinsberg and Nettetal. These languages are predominantly seen as belonging to the Limburgish language group.

They were also referred to as the East Limburgish group. It encompasses the varieties of Limburgish spoken in Germany. They are also seen as part of the Meuse-Rhenish language group. People from outside the Rhineland often make less distinctions and use the term Rhinelandic for large set of varieties of languages.

The Limburgish group belongs to the Continental West Germanic dialect continuum. As usual inside dialect continua, neighboring languages have a maximum of similarities, and speakers being used to the rather small individual lingual differences in their immediate neighborhood perceive them as close, and familiar, while more distant ones become gradually harder to understand with distance. That ends, in the Dutch–German continuum at least, most often with incomprehensible dialects. Isoglosses are so dense in this area that practically every village or town has its own distinct dialect of Limburgish. Large cities such as Mönchengladbach, Krefeld, and Düsseldorf have several local dialect varieties. The named cities have in common, that they are large enough to in part extend outside the area of the dialect group. Thus each has one or more quarters outside, having vernacular languages belonging to adjacent groups, such as Cleverlands or Ripuarian.

An area close to Westphalia called  is considered to be the area where  is spoken. This area is limited roughly by a line . For a more encompassing view, see the article on Low Rhenish.

 (also called ) is the Dutch term for a group of dialects spoken north of the Uerdingen line, i.e. from just south of Venlo upward to the North in the Dutch province of Limburg. Hoppenbrouwers 2001). The term  is used by Jo Daan for the entire province north of the Uerdingen line, whereas other linguists use it only for the part that has tonality, the language north of this region then being considered Kleverlandish.

The north border of the Limburgish tonality zone lies a little north of Arcen and Horst aan de Maas and just above the meej/mich isogloss, also known as the "mich-kwartier". This makes this Limburgish isogloss the northernmost of all. Venlo lies between the meej/mich isogloss and the Uerdingen line, so the Venlo dialect is the only one with both forms ik and mich/dich. All dialects in the Dutch province of Limburg spoken north of the tonality border are South Guelderish in linguistic respect.

The dialects spoken in the most southeastern part of the Dutch province of North Brabant (i.e. in and around Budel and Maarheeze) also have many Limburgish characteristics. An important difference between these dialects and the adjacent ones in the Dutch province of Limburg is, however, that the second-person pronoun  gij is here used instead of doe, as in "purely" Brabantian dialects.

Centraal-Limburgs includes the area around Maastricht, Sittard, Roermond, the eastern half of Belgian Limburg, and the Belgian Voeren area, and stretches further Northeast. Belgian linguists  use a more refined classification. Dutch linguists use the term Oost-Limburgs for the form of Limburgish spoken in an area from Belgian Voeren south of Maastricht in the Netherlands to the German border. For them, West-Limburgs is the variety of Limburgish spoken in Belgium in the area east of the Uerdingen line, for example in and around Hasselt and Tongeren. It includes areas in Dutch Limburg (like Ool, Maria Hoop and Montfort) and Dutch Brabant. The border of West-Limburgs and Oost-Limburgs starts a little south of the area between the villages of 's-Gravenvoeren and Sint-Martens-Voeren in the Belgian municipality of Voeren.

Southeast Limburgish is spoken in and around Kerkrade, Simpelveld, Bocholtz and Vaals in the Netherlands, Aachen in Germany and Raeren and Eynatten in Belgium. Especially in Germany these dialects are usually considered as variants of Ripuarian, not of Limburgish. According to a vision, however, all varieties in a wider half circle some 15 to 20 km around Aachen, including 2/3 of Dutch South Limburg and also the so-called Low Dietsch area between Voeren and Eupen in Belgium, can be taken as a group of its own, at the place where the Netherlands, Belgium and Germany meet. This variety still possesses interesting syntactic idiosyncrasies, probably dating from the period in which the old Duchy of Limburg existed.

Jan Goossens defines the northwest boundary of South East Limburgish at the lijk-lich isogloss. The area between this line and the Benrath line is called Ripuarian-Limburgish. The area between the Benrath line and the aat-alt isogloss is then called Aachens or Limburgish-Ripuarian.

Orthography
Limburgish has many varieties hence there isn't a standard written form. However the Limburgish Language Council has adopted a standard orthography for Limburgish since 2003 and it is used in its websites as well as  dictionaries. This is the form presented below.

Alphabet

Limburgish orthography

Digraphs

Monophthong vowels

Diphthongs vowels

Phonology
The sound inventory below is based on the variety of West-Limburgs spoken in Montfort.

Consonants

  may not show up in the Hasselt dialect, but is common in other Limburgish dialects, e.g. zègke (Dutch: zeggen) "to say".
 Other Limburgish dialects also have the following sounds:  (landj);  (tenj, teeth).
It is rare in the Montfortian dialect.
This is termed Soft G in Dutch dialectology.
 In most modern dialects,  is  uvular.

Overall, Limburgish dialects tend to have more consonants than Dutch. They also tend to have more vowels. According to Peter Ladefoged, the vowel inventory of the dialect of Weert is perhaps the richest in the world. It has 28 vowels, among which there are 12 long monophthongs (three of which surface as centering diphthongs), 10 short monophthongs and 6 diphthongs.

In most of the Limburgish dialects spoken to the southeast of Panningen—for example those of Roermond, Sittard and Heerlen— appears at the beginning of words in the consonant clusters sp, st, sl, sm, sn and zw. The same sound is realized as  elsewhere (e.g. sjtraot/straot, "street"). This is not the case, however, in the dialects of for example Venlo, Weert, Maastricht, Echt, Montfort and Posterholt.

Vowels

Monophthongs

  only occurs in unstressed syllables.
  are realised as  before alveolar consonants.

Diphthongs

The diphthongs  occur, as well as combinations of  + .  only occurs in French loanwords and interjections.

The Standard Dutch equivalents are na  and naar .

They are retained in French loanwords such as dzjuus .

Tone

Many dialects of Limburgish (and of Ripuarian) have a pitch accent, having two different accents used in stressed syllables. The difference between these two accents is used for differentiating both various grammatical forms of a single lexeme and minimal tone pairs one from the other.

With specific regards to Limburgish, these two accents are traditionally known as sjtoettoen ("push tone") and sjleiptoen ("dragging tone"). The dragging tone is lexical while the push tone is not. For example,  daãg with a dragging tone means "day" in Limburgish, while in many Limburgish dialects  daàg with a push tone is the plural form, "days" (in addition,  can also be articulated in a neutral tone as a third possibility. In this case, it means "bye-bye").

This difference is grammatical, but not lexical. An example of a lexical difference caused by dragging tone is the word  biè which is articulated with a push tone and means "bee", forming a tonal minimal pair with  biẽ, which is articulated with a dragging tone and means "at".

Pitch accent in comparison with "real" tonality
However, this feature cannot be compared to the "real" tone systems such as for example that of Chinese or Vietnamese, the number of tone contours and their division being far more restricted in Limburgish than in these languages. Other Indo-European languages with a pitch accent include Lithuanian, Latvian, Swedish, Norwegian, Standard Slovene (only some speakers), and Serbo-Croatian.

Most of these languages being spoken at the borders of Europe, it has been suggested that tonality once was present in Proto-Indo-European, and that its disappearance would have spread from the center of the European continent. However, it is generally accepted that this system was already lost in Proto-Germanic. A more plausible explanation of the origin of the Limburgish/Ripuarian tone system is that it originated in the Middle Ages from the apocope of plural schwas in the dialect of Cologne (Kölsch). This change necessitated at its turn a somewhat different articulation of the preceding vowel in the singular form, which was lengthened as in German but only to a limited extent, in order to keep on distinguishing the singular from the plural forms. This specific way of vowel lengthening may finally have resulted in the dragging tone.

Particular local features

Bitonality
It has been proven by speech analysis that in the Belgian Limburgish dialect of Borgloon, the dragging tone itself is bitonal, while it has also been proved that this is not the case in the adjacent Limburgish dialects of Tongeren and Hasselt.

Steeper fall
Other research has indicated that the push tone has a steeper fall in the eastern dialects of Limburgish (e.g. those of Venlo, Roermond and Maasbracht) than it has in western dialects. In addition, both the phonetic realisation and the syllable-based distribution of the contrasts between push and dragging tone seem to be mora-bound in the eastern dialects only. This has been examined especially by Jörg Peters.

Diphthongization
Moreover, in some dialects such as that of Sittard and Maastricht, especially the mid and high vowels tend to diphthongize when they have a push tone. So in the dialect of Sittard  means "to choose" while in the dialect of Maasbracht no diphthongization takes place, so  means the same here. This difference has been examined in particular by Ben Hermans and Marc van Oostendorp.

Other examples include plural
  steĩn "stone"
  steìn "stones"
and lexical
  "grave"
  "hole next to a road"

Verbs distinguish mood with tone:
  "We conquer!"
  "May we conquer!"

The difference between push tone and dragging tone may also purely mark grammatical declension without there being any difference in meaning, as in the dialect of Borgloon: gieël ("yellow", with dragging tone) as opposed to en gieël peer ("a yellow pear", with push tone). This tonal shift also occurs when the adjective gets an inflectional ending, as in nen gieëlen appel ("a yellow apple").

In some parts of Limburg, the tonal plural is being replaced with the Dutch forms among the younger generation, so that the plural for daag becomes dage.

Samples
The sample texts are readings of the first sentence of The North Wind and the Sun.

Phonetic transcription (Hasselt, West Limburgish)

Orthographic version (Hasselt, West Limburgish)

Phonetic transcription (Maastricht, Central Limburgish)

Orthographic version (Maastricht, Central Limburgish)

 Grammar 

 Nouns 

 Gender 
Limburgish has three grammatical genders. In some of the Limburgish dialects,  is used before masculine words beginning with b, d, h, t or with a vowel and in many other dialects  is used before all masculine words.

 Plural 
For some nouns, Limburgish uses simulfixes (i.e. umlaut) to form the plural:

  –  (brother – brothers)

Plural and diminutive nouns based on Umlaut start to prevail east towards Germany. However, towards the west, the phonemic distinction between dragging and pushing tone will stop just before Riemst.

 Diminutives 
The diminutive suffix is most often -ke, as in Brabantian, or -je/-sje after a dental consonant. For some nouns an umlaut is also used and in breurke for 'little brother' and sjeunke for 'little shoe'.

 Adjectives 
According to their declension, Limburgish adjectives can be grouped into two classes. Adjectives of the first class get the ending -e in their masculine and feminine singular forms and always in plural, but no ending in their neuter singular form. When combined with a masculine noun in singular adjectives may also end on -en, under the same phonological conditions which apply to articles. The other declension class includes most adjectives ending on -f, -g, -j, -l,-m,-n, -ng, -r, -w or -s preceded by a vowel; these adjectives only get the ending  in their masculine singular form.

When used as a predicate, Limburgish adjectives never get an ending:  (Maastrichtian: "That man is crazy"). Except for neuter adjectives which sometimes get -t: "'t Eint of 't angert", though this is dying out.

 Pronouns 

 Personal pronouns 

 Possessive pronouns 

In the masculine singular forms of mien, dien, zien and oos, final -n is added under the same phonological conditions which apply to articles and adjectives. Deletion of the final -n in the neuter forms of mien, dien, zien no longer occurs in the dialect of Venlo and is also disappearing in the dialect of Roermond.

 Demonstrative pronouns 
The most common demonstrative pronouns in Limburgish are:

Vocabulary
Most of the modern Limburgish vocabulary is very similar to that of Standard Dutch or to that of Standard German due to a heavy influence from the two. However, some of the basic vocabulary is rooted in neighboring Central German dialects.

Historically, the vocabulary of the varieties of Limburgish spoken within current Belgian territory has been more influenced by French than that of the Limburgish dialects spoken on Dutch and German soil, as appears form words such as briquet ("cigarette-lighter"), camion ("truck") and crevette ("shrimp"). The language has similarities with both German and Dutch, and Hendrik van Veldeke, a medieval writer from the region, is referred to as both one of the earlier writers in German and one of the earliest writers in Dutch.

See also
Limburgish Wikipedia
Low Dietsch
Low Rhenish
Meuse-Rhenish
Southeast Limburgish/Southern Meuse-Rhenish

Notes

References

Sources

 Bakkes, Pierre (2007): Mofers Waordebook.  
 

 Driessen, Geert (2012): Ontwikkelingen in het gebruik van Fries, streektalen en dialecten in de periode 1995-2011. Nijmegen: ITS.
Frins, Jean (2005): Syntaktische Besonderheiten im Aachener Dreilãndereck. Eine Übersicht begleitet von einer Analyse aus politisch-gesellschaftlicher Sicht. Groningen: RUG Repro [Undergraduate Thesis, Groningen University] 
Frins, Jean (2006): Karolingisch-Fränkisch. Die plattdůtsche Volkssprache im Aachener Dreiländereck''. Groningen: RUG Repro [Master's Thesis, Groningen University]

Further reading

External links

On Limburgish Tones (in Dutch)
Map of dialects spoken in Dutch Limburg
Limburgish Wiktionary – De Limburgse Wiktionair
Limburgish Academy Foundation (Stiechting Limbörgse Academie) with dictionaries Limburgish-Dutch, Limburgish-English, Dutch-Limburgish and English-Limburgish and a history of the Limburgish language 
Veldeke Genk (in Genk dialect and Dutch)

 
Languages of Belgium
Languages of the Netherlands
Languages of Germany
Limburg (region)
Low Franconian languages
Subject–object–verb languages
Tonal languages
Verb-second languages
Culture of Limburg (Netherlands)
Limburg (Belgium)
Liège Province
Rhineland